Barimunya Airport  is located at Barimunya, in the Pilbara region of Western Australia and is approximately  northeast of the Yandi mine.

See also 
 List of airports in Western Australia
 Aviation transport in Australia

References

External links
 Airservices Aerodromes & Procedure Charts

Pilbara airports